Major General Mamdouh Shahin is an Egyptian soldier, politician and Assistant Defense Minister for Legal and Constitutional Affairs. He is a member of the Supreme Council of the Armed Forces (SCAF), and represents the military in the Constituent Assembly of Egypt.

Shahin was appointed to SCAF in May 2011. The Defense Ministry nominated Shahin for the Constituent Assembly on 10 June 2012. A few days later June 2013 reports circulated that Shahin intended to withdraw from the Constituent Assembly, though the reports were swiftly repudiated.

References

Year of birth missing (living people)
Living people
Members of the Supreme Council of the Armed Forces
Egyptian generals